The 2003–04 Liga Leumit season saw Hapoel Haifa win the title and promotion to the Premier League. Runners-up Hapoel Nazareth Illit were also promoted to the Premier League for the first time in their history.

Bottom-placed Hapoel Ramat Gan were relegated to Liga Artzit. Tzafririm Holon were also due to be relegated, but were reprieved after Maccabi Kiryat Gat were demoted to Liga Alef due to financial difficulties.

Final table

External links
Israel Second Level 2003/04 RSSSF

Liga Leumit seasons
Israel
2003–04 in Israeli football leagues